Hang Li Po was reported to be a Chinese princess sent by the Ming Dynasty to be wed to Malaccan Sultan Mansur Shah (r. 1456–1477), according to the Malay Annals, which is a UNESCO heritage document and the principal source of historical information on the Malay archipelago in the 15th and early 16th century.

The account of Sultan Mansur Shah being wed to a wife of Chinese descent who bore a son named Paduka during their marriage is corroborated by a Portuguese colonial text.

The legend of Hang Li Po was an important figure in Malaysian national consciousness, as she was a person of Chinese ancestry who lived among Malay Muslims, bearing a royal seal of approval during the early history of the Malay archipelago thus paving the way for the cultural acceptance and social assimilation of Chinese immigrant laborers who were later brought to the Malay peninsula during the British colonial period during the 18th and 19th century.

Due to the Cultural Revolution in China in 1966, records and relics from the Ming Dynasty, including the official annals of Chinese mariner, Zheng He, were destroyed, resulting in large gaps in Chinese historical accounts. However, historical relics associated with her presence still remains in Malaysia, including the Hang Li Po well, also known as the King's well, dating back to 1459, located in the city of Malacca in Melaka, Malaysia, which has been designated a UNESCO heritage site.

According to historical records, Malacca had sent four royal missions to China in 1412, 1413, 1415 and 1418, while the kingdoms of Siam, Java or Cambodia did not send any royal envoys to China during the same period.  It was reported that the Malaccan rulers sought the protection of China in the event of an invasion by Siam.  There are no records that China exerted any type of political or military control, although Southeast Asia was part of its sphere of influence and countries like Siam paid taxes to China as part of the tributary system.

The princess's vast entourage was recorded to be 500 followers and Sultan Mansur Shah provide a hill as their settlement, now known as Bukit Cina, as a gift to his new Chinese bride, Princess Hang Li Po, in the mid-15th century. Now, there are more than 12,000 graves in the cemetery and the oldest dates back to 1622. After the Portuguese conquered Malacca in 1511, the forested Bukit Cina was razed by Portuguese missionaries, who established a monastery atop the hill in 1581.  When the Dutch captured Malacca from Portuguese control in 1641, the Dutch colonial administration re-designated Bukit Cina as a Chinese cemetery in 1685.

The figure of Hang Li Po was an early prototype of transculturation and interracial marriage in the early history of the Malay archipelago.  The cultural and genealogical heritage from her era is unmistakable in the Peranakan culture and descendants found in cities such as Penang and Malacca in present-day Malaysia which is characterized by a unique hybridization of ancient Chinese culture with the local cultures of the Nusantara region. With the transition of the Malay archipelago to Islamization from the 15th century onwards, the trend of inter-ethnic marriage went into decline in the region.

See also
 Chinese Hill
 Malaysian Chinese
 Nyonya
 Sultanate of Malacca

References

External links
 Discovery of Zheng He’s Guan Chang ( 官厂 )in Melaka
 https://web.archive.org/web/20060629085002/http://www.chinahistoryforum.com/lofiversion/index.php/t3886.html
 https://web.archive.org/web/20060326111725/http://www.kakiseni.com/articles/reviews/MDUwNA.html
 https://web.archive.org/web/20051203115735/http://special.time.net.my/e-life/ai_ling.cfm

History of Malacca
Malaysian people of Chinese descent
Ming dynasty princesses
People from Malacca
Spouses of sultans